Równe may refer to:
Polish name for Rivne in Ukraine
Równe, Masovian Voivodeship (east-central Poland)
Równe, Opole Voivodeship (south-west Poland)
Równe, Pomeranian Voivodeship (north Poland)
Równe, Subcarpathian Voivodeship (south-east Poland)
Równe, West Pomeranian Voivodeship (north-west Poland)